Lac Rieutard (English: Rieutard Lake) is a freshwater body from the watershed of the Jacques-Cartier River, and sub-basins of the Rivière Jacques-Cartier Nord-Ouest and Cavée River, in the unorganized territory of Lac-Jacques-Cartier, in the La Côte-de-Beaupré Regional County Municipality, in the administrative region of Capitale-Nationale, in the province of Quebec, in Canada.

The area around the lake is served by a secondary forest road which passes on the east side.

Forestry is the main economic activity in the sector; recreational tourism, second. Lac Rieutard is located in the heart of the Laurentides Wildlife Reserve.

The surface of Rieutard Lake is usually frozen from the beginning of December to the end of March, however the safe circulation on the ice is generally made from mid-December to mid-March.

Geography 
The main watersheds near Lake Rieutard are:
 north side: Franchère Lake, Germain lake, Joyal stream;
 east side: Côte l'Enfer stream, Jacques-Cartier River;
 south side: Cavée River, Rivière Jacques-Cartier Nord-Ouest;
 west side: rivière aux Écorces du Milieu.

In addition to the discharge (coming from the east) of a group of lakes (Mérillon, Dugas, de la Rocaille, Hardy, Joug and Dan), this lake is also fed by five riparian streams. It has three small islands. The mouth of Rieutard Lake is located to the southeast, at:
  North of the confluence of the Cavée River and the rivière Jacques-Cartier Nord-Ouest;
  north-west of the confluence of the rivière Jacques-Cartier Nord-Ouest and the Jacques-Cartier River;
  north of the confluence of the Jacques-Cartier River and Saint-Laurent river.

Toponymy 
The term "Rieutard" constitutes a family name of French origin. In history, this patronym has spread particularly in France and Louisiana.

The Bulletin of Historical Research, vol. XVIII, 1912, page 3, published: "Doctors Rieutord Père et Fils On the Nancy in the harbor of Quebec, in 1759, was a Gascon. Jean-Baptiste Rieutord, surgeon, from Grammont. He came, without suspecting that the country would soon pass to England, to settle in Canada. He settled in Baie Saint-Paul where he married in 1758, a young and valiant Canadian, Pélagie Perron, nineteen years old. From there, he went to Château-Richer where he raised his family... "

The toponym "Lac Rieutard" was formalized on December 5, 1968, by the Commission de toponymie du Québec.

See also 

 List of lakes of Canada

References 

Lakes of Capitale-Nationale
La Côte-de-Beaupré Regional County Municipality
Laurentides Wildlife Reserve